The Goff–Gratch equation is one (arguably the first reliable in history) amongst many experimental correlation proposed to estimate the saturation water vapor pressure at a given temperature.

Another similar equation based on more recent data is the Arden Buck equation.

Historical note

This equation is named after the authors of the original scientific article who described how to calculate the saturation water vapor pressure above a flat free water surface as a function of temperature (Goff and Gratch, 1946). Goff (1957) later revised his formula, and the latter was recommended for use by the World Meteorological Organization in 1988, with further corrections in 2000. 

The current 2015 edition of the WMO Technical Regulations (WMO-No. 49) however states in Volume 1, Part III, Section 1.2.1, that any formula or constant given in the Guide to Meteorological Instruments and Methods of Observation a.k.a. CIMO-Guide (WMO-No. 8) shall be used, and this document only contains the much simpler Magnus formula (Annex 4.B. – Formulae for the computation of measures of humidity). Regarding the measurement of upper-air humidity, this publication also reads (in Section 12.5.1):

The saturation with respect to water cannot be measured much below –50 °C, so manufacturers should use one of the following expressions for calculating saturation vapour pressure relative to water at the lowest temperatures – Wexler (1976, 1977), reported by Flatau et al. (1992)., Hyland and Wexler (1983) or Sonntag (1994) – and not the Goff-Gratch equation recommended in earlier WMO publications.

Experimental correlation

The original Goff–Gratch (1945) experimental correlation reads as follows:

{|
|-
|
|
|-
|
|
|
|-
|
|
|}

where:
log refers to the logarithm in base 10
e* is the saturation water vapor pressure (hPa)
T is the absolute air temperature in kelvins
Tst is the steam-point (i.e. boiling point at 1 atm.) temperature (373.15 K) 
e*st is e* at the steam-point pressure (1 atm = 1013.25 hPa)

Similarly, the correlation for the saturation water vapor pressure over ice is:

{|
|-
|
|
|-
|
|
|}

where:
log stands for the logarithm in base 10
e*i is the saturation water vapor pressure over ice (hPa)
T is the air temperature (K)
T0 is the ice-point (triple point) temperature (273.16 K) 
e*i0 is e* at the ice-point pressure (6.1173 hPa)

See also
Vapour pressure of water
Antoine equation
Arden Buck equation
Tetens equation
Lee–Kesler method

References

 Goff, J. A., and Gratch, S. (1946) Low-pressure properties of water from −160 to 212 °F, in Transactions of the American Society of Heating and Ventilating Engineers, pp 95–122, presented at the 52nd annual meeting of the American Society of Heating and Ventilating Engineers, New York, 1946.
 Goff, J. A. (1957) Saturation pressure of water on the new Kelvin temperature scale, Transactions of the American Society of Heating and Ventilating Engineers, pp 347–354, presented at the semi-annual meeting of the American Society of Heating and Ventilating Engineers, Murray Bay, Que. Canada.
 World Meteorological Organization (1988) General meteorological standards and recommended practices, Appendix A, WMO Technical Regulations, WMO-No. 49.
 World Meteorological Organization (2000) General meteorological standards and recommended practices, Appendix A, WMO Technical Regulations, WMO-No. 49, corrigendum.

Notes

External links

 Free Windows Program, Moisture Units Conversion Calculator w/Goff-Gratch equation — PhyMetrix

Atmospheric thermodynamics